Westmoreland County may refer to:

In Australia
 Westmoreland County, New South Wales
 the former name of Westmoreland Land District, Tasmania, Australia

In Canada
Westmorland County, New Brunswick

In the United Kingdom
 The county of Westmorland, archaically spelt Westmoreland.

In the United States
 Westmoreland County, Pennsylvania
 Westmoreland County, Virginia
 Westmoreland County, Connecticut - A former county in Connecticut located in present-day Wyoming Valley

See also 

 Westmoreland Parish, Jamaica

County name disambiguation pages